Mordellistena cincta is a beetle in the genus Mordellistena of the family Mordellidae. It was described in 1891 by George Charles Champion.  It is endemic to Guatemala.

References

cincta
Beetles described in 1891